The 1984–85 network television schedule for the three major English language commercial broadcast networks in the United States. The schedule covers primetime hours from September 1984 through August 1985. The schedule is followed by a list per network of returning series, new series, and series cancelled after the 1983–84 season.

PBS, the Public Broadcasting Service, was in operation but the schedule was set by each local station.

New series are highlighted in bold.

All times are U.S. Eastern and Pacific Time (except for some live sports or events). Subtract for one hour for Central, Mountain, Alaska and Hawaii-Aleutian times.

Each of the 30 highest-rated shows is listed with its rank and rating as determined by Nielsen Media Research.

Legend

Sunday

Note: Beginning December 16, ABCs Sunday schedule between 8:00 p.m. and 11:00 p.m. varied, consisting of three-hour broadcasts of The ABC Sunday Night Movie, two-hour broadcasts of The ABC Sunday Night Movie starting at 8:00 p.m. with specials airing at 10:00 p.m., specials airing at 8:00 p.m. followed by a two-hour broadcast of The ABC Sunday Night Movie starting at 9:00 p.m., or miniseries or sports programming during the entire three-hour block.

Monday

Tuesday

Wednesday

Thursday

Friday

Saturday

By network

ABC

Returning Series
20/20
The ABC Sunday Night Movie
ABC NFL Monday Night Football
Benson
Dynasty
The Fall Guy
Foul-Ups, Bleeps & Blunders
Hardcastle and McCormick
Hotel
Life's Most Embarrassing Moments
The Love Boat
Matt Houston
Monday Night Baseball
Ripley's Believe It or Not!
T. J. Hooker
Webster

New Series
Call to Glory
The Comedy Factory *
Eye to Eye *
Finder of Lost Loves
Glitter
 Hail to the Chief *
Hawaiian Heat
Jessie
MacGruder and Loud *
Me and Mom *
Mr. Belvedere *
Moonlighting *
Off the Rack *
Paper Dolls
People Do the Craziest Things
Rock 'n' Roll Summer Action *
Street Hawk *
Three's a Crowd
Who's the Boss?
Wildside *

Not returning from 1983–84:
9 to 5
a.k.a. Pablo
Automan
Blue Thunder
Fantasy Island
Happy Days
Hart to Hart
It's Not Easy
Just Our Luck
Lottery!
Masquerade
Oh Madeline
Shaping Up
That's Incredible!
Three's Company
Trauma Center
Two Marriages

CBS

Returning Series
60 Minutes
Airwolf
AfterMASH
Alice
Cagney & Lacey
Dallas
The Dukes of Hazzard
Falcon Crest
The Jeffersons
Kate & Allie
Knots Landing
Magnum, P.I.
Mickey Spillane's Mike Hammer
Newhart
Rosie
Scarecrow and Mrs. King
Simon & Simon
Trapper John, M.D.

New Series
Charles in Charge
Cover Up
Crazy Like a Fox *
Detective in the House *
Double Dare *
Dreams
E/R
I Had Three Wives *
The Lucie Arnaz Show *
Murder, She Wrote
Otherworld *

Not returning from 1983–84:
The American Parade
Cutter to Houston
Domestic Life
Double Dare
Empire
Emerald Point N.A.S.
The Four Seasons
Maggie Briggs
Mama Malone
The Mississippi
One Day at a Time
Whiz Kids

NBC

Returning Series
The A-Team
Cheers
Diff'rent Strokes
Double Trouble *
The Facts of Life
Family Ties
Gimme a Break!
Hill Street Blues
Knight Rider
NBC Sunday Night Movie
NBC Monday Night at the Movies
Night Court
Remington Steele
Riptide
St. Elsewhere
Silver Spoons
TV's Bloopers & Practical Jokes

New Series
Berrenger's *
The Best Times *
Code Name: Foxfire *
The Cosby Show
Highway to Heaven
Half Nelson *
Hot Pursuit
Hunter
It's Your Move
Miami Vice
Our Time
Partners in Crime
Punky Brewster
Sara *
Spencer/Under One Roof *
V: The Series

Not returning from 1983–84:
Bay City Blues
Boone
Buffalo Bill
Comedy Zone
The Duck Factory
First Camera
For Love and Honor
Jennifer Slept Here
Legmen
Mama's Family
Manimal
The Master
Mr. Smith
The New Show
People Are Funny
Real People
The Rousters
Summer Sunday U.S.A.
We Got It Made
The Yellow Rose

Note: The * indicates that the program was introduced in midseason.

References

United States primetime network television schedules
1984 in American television
1985 in American television